The discography of Regina Spektor, a Russian-American anti-folk musician, consists of eight studio albums, four extended plays, two live albums, and twenty-six singles.

Spektor's first two albums were released exclusively in the United States; Soviet Kitsch, Begin to Hope, Far and What We Saw from the Cheap Seats were released worldwide. The compilation Mary Ann Meets the Gravediggers and Other Short Stories, containing songs from Spektor's first three albums, was assembled for the UK market.

Albums

Studio albums

Live albums

Compilation albums

Extended plays

Singles

Other appearances

Compilation appearances

Collaborations

References

Folk music discographies
Discographies of American artists
Discographies of Russian artists
Pop music discographies